The Somerset Dam Power Station is a hydro power station at Somerset, South East Queensland, Australia.  The plant is part of the Somerset Dam.  It has a generating capacity of 4.1 megawatts.

The 2010–2011 Queensland floods resulted in the station being flooded and needing a $11.6 million restoration.  It wasn't until 2019 that the plant began generating electricity again.

See also

List of active power stations in Queensland

References

Hydroelectric power stations in Queensland
Buildings and structures in South East Queensland
1954 establishments in Australia
Energy infrastructure completed in 1954